The Netta  is a river in north-east Poland, a right tributary of the Biebrza, approximately  long. It is a continuation of the Rospuda, which flows into Lake Rospuda (connected to Lake Necko) north of the town of Augustów.

The Netta runs parallel to, or (on its upper and lower stretches) forms part of, the Augustów Canal, built in the 19th century to link the basins of the Vistula and the Neman. It connects to the Vistula via the Biebrza, the Narew and the Bug River. The Netta's main tributaries are the Szczeberka, Kolniczanka, Olszanka and Turówka.

The Netta begins its course in Augustów, where it flows out of Lake Necko and southwards through the town. At Białobrzegi it joins the Turówka and continues southwards, flowing through the districts of Gmina Augustów and Gmina Sztabin. After joining the Olszanka it enters Biebrza National Park. Shortly before its confluence with the Biebrza it passes through the villages of Polkowo and Dębowo.

External links  

Rivers of Poland
Rivers of Podlaskie Voivodeship